Amobi Chidubem Okugo (born March 13, 1991) is an American soccer player who currently plays as a midfielder and defender for Austin Bold FC in the USL Championship.

Career

College
Okugo grew up in Sacramento, California, attended Rio Americano High School and Jesuit High School, and played one year of college soccer at UCLA in 2009, where he was named the 2009 Pac-10 Freshman of the Year.

Professional
Okugo was drafted in the first round (6th overall) of the 2010 MLS SuperDraft by Philadelphia Union. He made his professional debut on March 25, 2010, in the opening game of the 2010 MLS season against Seattle Sounders FC. After featuring in 26 league matches in his first two seasons with Philadelphia, Okugo became a regular starter for the Union during the 2012 season appearing in 27 matches. During the 2013 he continued to anchor the Union back line as he appeared in 32 matches and scored three goals. In June 2014 Okugo moved to his familiar role of defensive midfielder with the hiring of manager Jim Curtin and played there throughout the rest of the season.

In December 2014, Okugo was traded to Orlando City SC for allocation money and the Union's second round pick in the 2016 MLS SuperDraft. While with Orlando he featured mostly as a starter in his 15 matches with the club. On July 20, 2015, Okugo was traded to Sporting Kansas City in a swap deal which involved Servando Carrasco moving to Orlando City Soccer Club.

On April 10, 2016, Major League Soccer loaned Okugo to the New York Red Bulls II of the United Soccer League. Because Okugo is still under contract with the league and unattached, they are able to loan him and his contract. The same day he made his debut for the side starting in central defense in a 4–0 victory over Bethlehem Steel FC.

After his quick stint with Red Bulls II, Okugo signed a permanent deal with the defending MLS Cup Champions, Portland Timbers on May 16. Following the end of the 2017 season, Okugo's option was declined by the Timbers. Okugo's next professional appearance came for NPSL side Sacramento Gold FC in a 2–1 loss to Sacramento Republic FC.

On February 11, 2019, Okugo signed for the Austin Bold FC.

International
Okugo has been a mainstay in U.S. youth national teams for many years. He played with the U-20s at the 2009 CONCACAF Championships and with the U-18s at the 2009 Australian Youth Festival, where he scored two goals in three games. He was in residency with the U.S. U-17s and had six caps in 2007, and scored the only goal for the U.S. U-18 team at the 2008 Lisbon Tournament.

Okugo started and played the full 90 minutes in 2 games for the U-20's at the Torneo De Las Americas in November 2010. He captained the team in their match vs. Colombia. Okugo was also a late addition to the U-20 camp in January 2011.

Okugo, along with Union teammate Zac MacMath, was called up to the U-20 squad for the CONCACAF U-20 Championship in March and April 2011. Philadelphia Union were the only Major League Soccer team with two players represented. In late 2011, Okugo was called into the first two USMNT U-23 Olympic camps. Okugo was called into the final camp before qualifying as the U-23's take on the Mexican U-23's.

Career statistics

Personal
Okugo was born to Nigerian parents.
His favorite players growing up were Nigerian internationals Jay-Jay Okocha, Sunday Oliseh, and John Obi Mikel. In addition to playing professionally, Okugo once coached soccer to young soccer players in Philadelphia. Also, at age 13, Amobi played for what is largely considered the most dominant youth soccer team of all time, El Dorado Crew, where he won the US Youth Soccer Far West Regional Championships in Spokane, Washington in a stunning 5–0 victory over Santa Cruz County Chivitias. Amobi also runs a website called Frugal Athlete where he and other professional athletes post blog articles and videos to help increase financial literacy and encourage prudent financial practices among their peers in professional sports as well as the general public at large. He received his Bachelor's Degree in Organizational Leadership and Development with a minor in Business Administration, to be followed by graduate school.

Okugo's cousin is fellow professional soccer player Chimdum Mez.

References

External links
 

1991 births
Living people
American soccer players
UCLA Bruins men's soccer players
Philadelphia Union players
Orlando City SC players
Sporting Kansas City players
New York Red Bulls II players
Portland Timbers players
Portland Timbers 2 players
Austin Bold FC players
Sportspeople from Hayward, California
Soccer players from Sacramento, California
University of California, Los Angeles alumni
Philadelphia Union draft picks
Major League Soccer players
USL Championship players
United States men's youth international soccer players
United States men's under-20 international soccer players
United States men's under-23 international soccer players
American sportspeople of Nigerian descent
2009 CONCACAF U-20 Championship players
Association football midfielders
Association football defenders
Sacramento Gold FC players